Sabolić is a Croatian surname. Notable people with the surname include:

 Ivan Sabolić (1921–1986), Yugoslavian sculptor

See also
 Robert Sabolič (born 1988), Slovenian ice hockey player

Croatian surnames